Hugh William Gough, 4th Viscount Gough  (22 February 1892 – 4 December 1951) was a British soldier and peer. He was educated at Eton College and attended New College, Oxford. He was a brevet major in the Irish Guards when he was wounded.

References

 
 

Gough, Hugh, 4th Viscount
Gough, Hugh, 4th Viscount
Gough, Hugh, 4th Viscount
Gough, Hugh, 4th Viscount
4
Gough, Hugh Gough, 4th Viscount
British Army personnel of World War II
People educated at Eton College
British Army personnel of World War I
Deputy Lieutenants of Galway
Deputy Lieutenants of Inverness-shire